The 2010 Intercontinental Rally Challenge was the fifth season of the Intercontinental Rally Challenge. The season consisted of twelve rounds and started on 19 January with the Monte Carlo Rally. The season ended on November 6, at the Cyprus Rally.

Juho Hänninen became the drivers' champion after winning Rally Scotland, the third of his rally wins during the season. Hänninen also won in Argentina and Sardinia as he finished on the podium in ten of the eleven events that he contested during the season, of which three wins and four second places counted towards the championship's best seven scores rule. Škoda Motorsport team-mate Jan Kopecký finished in second place, some 18 points behind Hänninen. Although not as consistent as his team-mate, Kopecký won one event during the season, winning in the Canary Islands.

Third place was claimed by the top Peugeot driver and reigning champion Kris Meeke, after a third place in Scotland took him ahead of Freddy Loix. Meeke's season was blighted by errors of which retiring from five of the eleven events he contested but did take a win in Brazil. Despite taking part in four rallies, Loix's tarmac expertise shone through, winning the events in Ypres, Belgium, Madeira and the Czech Republic as well as a third place in Sanremo. Four other drivers took victories during the season; World Rally Championship front-runner Mikko Hirvonen won a one-off outing in Monte Carlo, Bruno Magalhães took his first IRC win in the Azores, Paolo Andreucci won in Sanremo and Nasser Al-Attiyah won in Cyprus when many of the leading contenders skipped the event. Škoda took the manufacturers' championship after the Barum Rally Zlín in the Czech Republic.

Calendar
The calendar consisted of twelve events run on two continents. Changes for 2010 season included the replacement of Rally Russia, Rally Japan and the Safari Rally with Rally Argentina, Rally d'Italia Sardegna and FxPro Cyprus Rally. In March it was announced that the Rally Islas Canarias would replace the Rally Principe de Asturias as the Spanish round on the schedule, moving from September to April.

Selected entries
M-Sport (Ford) and Subaru became the latest registered manufacturers to join the Intercontinental Rally Challenge, alongside Abarth (Fiat), Honda, Ralliart (Mitsubishi), Peugeot, Proton and Škoda.

Results

Standings

Drivers
 Only the best seven scores from each driver counted towards the championship.

Manufacturers
 Only the best seven scores from each manufacturer counted towards the championship.

References

External links
 The official website of the Intercontinental Rally Challenge

Intercontinental Rally Challenge seasons
Intercontinental Rally Challenge
2010 Intercontinental Rally Challenge season